Ning'an is a city located approximately  southwest of Mudanjiang, in the southeast of Heilongjiang province, China, bordering Jilin province to the south. It is located on the Mudanjiang River (formerly known as Hurka River), which flows north, eventually falling into the Sungari River near Sanxing.

Administratively, Ning'an is now a county-level city, and a constituent part of the prefecture-level city of Mudanjiang.

The government of the "county-level city" is located in the town of the same name.

Notable geographic features of the county-level city of Ning'an include Lake Jingpo and a crater underground forest.

History

Balhae 
Shangjing Longquanfu, one of the capitals of the Balhae kingdom (between 756 and 785, and between 793 and 926), was located within today's county-level city of Ning'an.

Qing dynasty 
During the early Qing dynasty, the town of Ning'an, known then under the Manchu name (Ningguta) (transcribed into Chinese as 宁古塔, Ningguta), was one of the most important towns in the entire Manchuria beyond the "Willow Palisade". The name "Ningguta" literally means "six" in Manchu language because it was once guarded by six grandsons of Möngke Temür.

The Hurka River valley, where Ningguta was located, was the traditional homeland of the Jianzhou Jurchens (who later started calling themselves Manchus), Ningguta and Sanxing being the two oldest centers of the incipient Manchu state.
After the Manchus conquered all of China in 1644, the Ningguta area continued to be considered by the Qing dynasty ruling family as the place of its origin.

Already in 1652 the Qing government sent 2000 horsemen, armed with bows, matchlock firearms, and iron cannons, commanded by Sarhuda to set a garrison at Ningguta, which was the first Qing garrison beyond the Willow Palisade. 
In June 1653 Sarhuda's position became styled "military deputy-lieutenant governor" (or amban-jianggin in Manchu) and a deputy lieutenant general were appointed to command the Ningguta garrison.

The suitability of Ningguta as an administrative center was in part due to its location on the Hurka River (or, for the original site, on the Hurka's tributary Hailang), which provided a convenient transportation route connecting Ningguta with the lower Sungari and the lower Amur River. Early on, a great dockyard operated in Ningguta, building boats for the Mudanjiang/Sungari/Amur river system, although it was later relocated to Jilin City.

In 1658 Sarhuda, in charge of a Manchu fleet of several dozen ships, and including also General Shin Ryu's Korean force, sailed from Ningguta down the Hurka and the Sungari, to defeat the smaller fleet of the Russian Cossack Onufriy Stepanov near the fall of the Sungari into the Amur.

After the death of Sarhuda in 1659, his son Bahai was appointed to occupy Sarhuda's position.

In 1662, the title of the military deputy-lieutenant governor  (amban-jianggin) position was changed to the Ningguta Military Governor, Bahai being the first occupant of this post, while the office of the deputy lieutenant general was relocated to Jilin City.

That site is located near the present-day Gucheng village, part of small town of Changting. That site is not within the modern County-level city of Ning'an, but in the neighboring County-level city of Hailin.

Growth of the more conveniently located  Jilin City resulted in the decrease of the relative importance of Ningguta. Still, Ningguta was the main seat of government of the eastern half of the beyond-the-palisade Manchuria until 1676, when the Military Governor (jiangjun) moved from Ningguta to  Jilin City (then called Jilin Ula Cheng, i.e. Jilin River City), and the Deputy Lieutenant-General was transferred in the opposite direction (from Jilin City to Ningguta).

Although now lower-ranked than Jilin City, Ningguta retained its importance into the 18th and 19th century as one of the few cities existing beyond the Willow Palisade. The Deputy Lieutenant-General stationed there was the top government official for the entire region stretching east to the Sea of Japan  and populated primarily by a variety of Tungusic peoples, such as the Nanais.

According to the evidence of the Jesuits who visited the area in 1709 along with a government-sponsored ginseng-harvesting expedition, by the early 18th century Ningguta had become an important center of trade in the local forest products, namely ginseng harvested in the region, and the sable pelts, collected as tax from the Nanai natives. Therefore, besides the Manchu garrison and the officials, Ningguta was home to numerous Chinese civilians, some of whom had come to Ningguta from faraway provinces in order to participate in the profitable commerce. There were already numerous peasant villages around the town, some at quite a distance from it, populated both by Manchus and by Han Chinese exiled to this area for various offenses against the law. (Convicts started being sent to Ningguta area as early as 1660; anti-Qing rebels, captured in southern China, followed in 1661) A variety of cereal crops, such as millet and oats were grown there.

Republic of China 
Following the fall of the Qing dynasty, Ning'an underwent a series of administrative changes. In March 1913, Ning'an Fu was re-organized as Ning'an County.

In February 1929, circuits were abolished, and Ning'an was administered directly by the province. At this time, Ning'an had a population of more than 170,000 people.

Japanese occupation 
Upon the formation of the puppet state of Manchukuo, Ning'an remained within Jilin province until December 1934, when it became part of the newly formed Binjiang province. In July 1937, it was placed under .

After occupation 
In July 1948, the area was once again adjusted, this time falling under the jurisdiction of Songjiang province. In August 1954, Songjiang province was abolished, and merged into Heilongjiang province. In March 1956, Ning'an, still a county, was placed under the then-prefecture of Mudanjiang. From 1956 to 1962, Ning'an's borders were changed multiple times, until finally reaching their current iteration.

In 1993, Ning'an was upgraded from a county to a county-level city.

Geography 

Ning'an is located in the southeast of Heilongjiang province, on the shores of Jingpo Lake and Mudan River. The terrain is largely hilly, and the Changbai Mountains run through the city.

Ning'an is bordered by Muling to the east, Hailin to the west, Wangqing County and Dunhua of Jilin province to the south, and Mudanjiang's urban core to the north.

Flora and fauna 
112 species of plants used for Chinese herbal medicines can be found in Ning'an.

Ning'an is home to a number of protected animal species, such as the Siberian tiger, sika deer, elk, and sable. There are over 300 species of birds which have habitats in the city, including Siberian cranes, Mandarin ducks, Chinese merganser, white-bellied sea eagles, and Steller's sea eagles.

Climate 
Ning'an typically experiences 130 to 135 frost-free days per year.

Administrative divisions 
Ning'an administers one subdistrict, eight towns, two townships, two ethnic townships, and two other township-level divisions.

Demographics

Economy 
Ning'an produces a large amount of edible mushrooms, totaling 10,000 tons per year.

Transportation 

See also 
 List of Provinces of Balhae

References

External links
 Ning'an City Government 

Cities in Heilongjiang
County level divisions of Heilongjiang